Gainsborough Trinity Football Club is a football club based in Gainsborough, Lincolnshire, England. Established in 1873, the club became members of the Football League in 1893 and remained members of the Second Division until 1912, making Gainsborough one of the smallest towns in England to have had a Football League team.

History
The club was established in 1873 as Trinity Recreationists by the Reverend George Langton Hodgkinson, vicar of Holy Trinity parish, Gainsborough. In 1889 the club were founder members of the Midland League, which they won in 1890–91. The club finished as runners-up the following season and again in 1895–96, after which they applied for election to the Football League. In the vote they finished third, ahead of existing members Port Vale and Crewe Alexandra, and were elected into the Second Division. The club's first season in Division Two of the League saw them finish seventh, but a gradual decline in form saw them finish in the bottom half of the table every season until 1904. In 1901–02 Trinity finished bottom of the division, but were re-elected. In 1904–05 the club finished sixth in Division Two, their best performance during their Football League membership.

In 1911–12 Gainsborough finished bottom of the Second Division for a second time, and failed to be re-elected, receiving just nine votes to the 27 received by newly elected Lincoln City. The club returned to the Midland League, finishing third in 1912–13 and second in 1913–14, after which they unsuccessfully applied for readmission to the Football League. When the Football League created a new Third Division North in 1921, Trinity applied for membership, but were again unsuccessful. The club won the Midland League title in 1927–28, and the following season defeated Football League opposition in the FA Cup for the first time since losing their League status, beating Crewe 3–1 in the first round, before losing to Chesterfield in the second round. In 1931–32 they beat Crewe again in the first round, before losing 5–2 at home to Watford. In 1937–38 Trinity beat Port Vale in the first round, before losing to fellow non-League club Yeovil & Petters United. Another Football League team was beaten the following season, when Trinity knocked out Gateshead in the first round, before losing to Doncaster Rovers.

Following World War II Gainsborough had further success in the FA Cup, reaching the first round of the FA Cup in 1945–46, losing to Mansfield Town, and in 1946–47, when they were beaten by Darlington. In 1948–49 they reached the second round after defeating Witton Albion in the first round, before losing 4–3 at Walsall. They went on to win a third Midland League title that season. First round appearances in the FA Cup followed in 1950–51 (losing 3–0 to Plymouth) and 1951–52 (losing to Witton), before the 1952–53 season saw another second round appearance; after beating Netherfield in a first round replay, they lost 2–1 at Newport County. They reached the first round again the following season, before losing 4–1 at home to Chesterfield. The club failed to repeat the feat until 1959–60, when they lost to Doncaster Rovers in a replay.

At the end of the 1959–60 season, the Midland League was disbanded. Gainsborough spent a single season playing in both the Central Alliance and Division Two of the Yorkshire League, before returning to a reformed Midland League in 1961. Trinity won their fourth Midland League title in 1966–67, also reaching the first round of the FA Cup (losing 1–0 at home to Colchester United), before becoming founder members of the new Northern Premier League in 1968. The club applied to join the Football League again in 1975 and 1976, but received only a single vote on each occasion. The 1983–84 season saw them reach the first round of the FA Cup for over a decade, as they lost 2–0 at home to Blackpool.

When the Northern Premier League added a second division in 1987, Gainsborough were placed in the Premier Division. In 1997–98 FA Cup saw them drawn against local rivals Lincoln City, who after a 1–1 draw lost 3–2 in a 'home' replay that was played at Lincoln's Sincil Bank. Another first round appearance in 2003–04 ended with a 7–1 defeat at Brentford. At the end of the season a tenth-place finish saw the club become founder members of the Conference North. FA Cup first round appearances followed in 2006–07 (a 3–1 defeat by Barnet) and 2007–08 (a 6–0 loss at home to Hartlepool United). In 2011–12 the club finished fourth, qualifying for the promotion play-offs. However, after beating FC Halifax Town in the semi-finals, Trinity lost the final 1–0 to Nuneaton Town. During the 2012–13 season they reached the semi-finals of the FA Trophy and managed to beat Wrexham 2-1 at home but would lose 4-3 on aggregate. In another FA Cup first round appearance in 2015–16, the club were beaten 1–0 by Shrewsbury Town. The club were relegated for the first time in their history at the end of the 2017–18 season, dropping into the Northern Premier League's Premier Division.

Ground

Trinity moved to the Northolme ground, then also a cricket venue, in 1884. During their time in the Football League the club also played home matches at the Bowling Green Ground in the north-west of the town and Sincil Bank in Lincoln when the Northolme was being used for cricket. The record attendance of 9,760 was set for a Midland League match against local rivals Scunthorpe United in 1948.

Rivals and local games

Gainsborough Trinity's location on the bank of the River Trent pits them against a host of clubs from Lincolnshire and Nottinghamshire. The most noted local derbys for Gainsborough are against Boston United and Worksop Town, as both clubs have spent numerous seasons in both the Northern Premier League and Conference North divisions with Trinity. Games with Boston or Worksop are traditionally played on Boxing Day and New Year's Day.

Professional clubs in traditional Lincolnshire such as Lincoln City, Scunthorpe United and Grimsby Town have rarely played Trinity outside of pre-season tournaments such as the Lincolnshire Senior Cup. The last competitive match between Trinity and a professional Lincolnshire club was when they played Lincoln City in the first round of the FA Cup in the 1996–97 season, with Trinity eventually losing 3–2 in the replay following a 1–1 draw at Sincil Bank.

Club officials
As of 14 March 2023

Current squad

Managerial history

Honours
Midland League
Champions 1890–91, 1927–28, 1948–49, 1966–67
Northern Premier League
Challenge Cup winners 1981–82, 1996–97
Lincolnshire Senior Cup
Winners 1889–90, 1892–93, 1894–95, 1897–98, 1903–04, 1904–05, 1906–07, 1910–11, 1970–71, 2002–03, 2017–18
Lincolnshire County Senior Cup
Winners 1946–47, 1947–48, 1948–49
Lincolnshire Senior 'A' Cup
Winners 1950–51, 1951–52, 1957–58, 1958–59, 1963–64
Lincolnshire Shield
Winners 2007–08, 2011–12

Records
Best FA Cup performance: Third round, 1886–87
Best FA Trophy performance: Semi-finals, 2012–13
Record attendance: 9,760 vs Scunthorpe United, Midland League, 1948
Biggest victory: 7–0 vs Fleetwood Town; 7–0 vs Great Harwood Town
Heaviest defeat: 1–7 vs Stalybridge Celtic, Northern Premier League, 2000–01; 1–7 vs Brentford, FA Cup, 2003–04
Record transfer fee paid: £3,000 to Burton Albion for Stuart Lowe
Record transfer fee received: £30,000 from Lincoln City for Tony James

See also
Gainsborough Trinity F.C. players
Gainsborough Trinity F.C. managers

References

External links

Gainsborough Trinity official youtube channel

 
Football clubs in England
Football clubs in Lincolnshire
Association football clubs established in 1873
1873 establishments in England
Gainsborough, Lincolnshire
Midland Football League (1889)
Former English Football League clubs
Central Alliance
Yorkshire Football League
Northern Premier League clubs
National League (English football) clubs